HMY Victoria and Albert was a twin-paddle steamer launched 25 April 1843. She functioned as a royal yacht of the sovereign of the United Kingdom, owned and operated by the Royal Navy, and was the first of three royal yachts to be named Victoria and Albert. She was laid down in 1842 at Pembroke Dock and was designed by William Symonds. She measured 1,034 tons burthen, carried two guns, and was the first royal yacht to be steam powered, being fitted with a  engine.

Steam yachts, first introduced in 1823, became popular amongst Victorian millionaires and Royalty around Europe.

She was lengthened in 1853.

She made twenty voyages.

Her Majesty's Yacht Osborne continued in service, conveying the Royal Family to their summer home, Osborne House, on the Isle of Wight. She was named after the Queen's new estate.

In the 1861 Census, Osborne, 'and her hulk Blonde' had on board, Master Commanding G H K Bowers; a master, boatswain, assistant engineer, quartermaster, 2 carpenters, 11 seamen, 3 stokers and 6 boys.

On 15 February 1862 the Prince of Wales boarded Osborne at Triest, having arrived by train. The Royal party stopped at Venice, the Dalmatian Coast, Corfu and Ionian Islands. She received a 21 gun salute at Alexandria. The tour continued via Jaffa, Constantinople, Athens, Malta and France, to return by train.

Osborne was scrapped in 1868.c.

References

External links

Bibliography

Royal Yachts of the United Kingdom
Steam yachts
1843 establishments in the United Kingdom
1843 ships